The CAR-15 XM177 or CAR-15 Commando was a part of the CAR-15 Military Weapons System designed in 1966 in response to the US military's desire for a compact M16 variant to improve on the inadequacies of earlier shortened M16 types.

Development history

Although the United States had already tested the CAR-15 Model 607 submachine gun in Vietnam, it had a number of shortcomings, including overwhelming muzzle blast and an overly complicated, unreliable collapsible stock. To address these problems, Colt came up with the XM177, which featured a number of improvements. The triangular collapsible stock was replaced with a much simpler two-position telescoping tubular aluminum buttstock, while the fragile improvised handguards of the Model 607 were replaced by reinforced round handguards. Each half of the round handguard is identical, simplifying logistics by not requiring a top/bottom or left/right pair. The Model 609 Commando has a forward assist, while the Model 610 Commando does not. A Model 610B with a four-position selector was available, but not used by the U.S. military.

Features

The XM177 uses a unique flash hider sometimes called a flash or sound moderator for its  barrel.

The Model 610 was classified as the XM177 but adopted by the Air Force as the GAU-5/A Submachine Gun (GAU = Gun, Automatic Unit). The Army purchased 2,815 Model 609 CAR-15 Commandos on June 28, 1966, which were officially designated Submachine Gun, 5.56 mm, XM177E1. As part of the contract, Colt was supposed to supply each XM177E1 with seven 30-round magazines, but Colt was unable to build a reliable 30-round curved magazine that would fit in the M16 magazine well, so most XM177E1s were shipped with 20-round magazines. The exception was 5th Special Forces Group, who received a total of four early 30-round magazines.  Colt completed delivery of the purchased XM177E1s in March 1967.

The increased length reduced noise and muzzle flash, and allowed fitting of the Colt XM148 grenade launcher. A metal boss was added to the moderator for mounting of the XM148 and rifle grenades. The chambers were chrome-plated. The Commandos with the longer barrels were called the Model 629 and Model 649. The Model 629 Commando has a forward assist; the Model 649 Commando does not.

In April 1967, the Army purchased 510 Colt 629 Commandos for use by troops assigned to the Military Assistance Command, Vietnam Studies and Observations Group (MACV-SOG), and designated them XM177E2.  Delivery was completed by the end of September 1967. The Air Force adopted a similar model without the forward assist feature as the GAU-5A/A.  Sources debate whether or not this was a Colt Model 630 or 649.  According to John Plaster and other sources, the lack of 30-round magazines continued to be problematic and SOG operators resorted to pooling their personal resources and purchasing the larger capacity magazines on the civilian U.S. market.  Problems with range, accuracy, barrel fouling, and usage of tracer bullets continued to plague the XM177 series, but Colt estimated that it would take a six-month $400,000 program to do a complete ballistic and kinematic study. There were also recommendations for a 29-month $635,000 research and development program. Both recommendations were declined by the U.S. military as American ground force involvement in the Vietnam War was gradually winding down. Production of the CAR-15 Commando ended in 1970.

People's Army of Vietnam's M-18 was designed based on M-16 rifles captured in the Vietnam War with some notable feature of the XM177E2 like adjustable stock, 10.5 inch barrel and muzzle device. They were first seen in public in 2010, made by Z111 Factory.

Derivatives

GUU-5/P

The United States Air Force has made ad hoc upgrades to its GAU-5/As and GAU-5A/As. The barrels and moderators were replaced with the longer  barrel with a 1-in-12 twist, but the weapons retained their original designations. With the change to M855 cartridges, they received either a new barrel with a 1:7 twist ratio or complete upper receiver assembly replacements. The GAU-5/A or GAU-5A/A markings were removed and the weapons redesignated GUU-5/P. They also retain automatic fire instead of burst.

The new designation more accurately reflected the weapon's place in the U.S. Air Force Aerospace Equipment Type Designation System (AETDS). The weapons had initially been designated in the same format as aircraft guns, being placed in the GA category (GA designating an aircraft gun, with U meaning unit, representing a complete system and not part of a kit), followed by the /A suffix meaning the system was for aircraft. GUU is the "guns, miscellaneous personal equipment" category, and the /P suffix indicating personal equipment.

Gallery

References 

5.56 mm firearms
ArmaLite AR-10 derivatives
Carbines
Cold War firearms of the United States
Colt rifles
Military equipment introduced in the 1960s
Rifles of the United States
Submachine guns of the United States